The Whigham GW-6 is an American mid-wing, single-seat, glider that was designed and constructed by Gene Whigham, a retired flight test engineer for Convair.

Design and development
Whigham completed and flew the GW-6 in 1983. The aircraft was intended to be a very lightweight glider and incorporated some design innovations to achieve that goal. The wing spar was built up from extruded angles, with a sheet aluminium spar web. The wing ribs are made from sheet aluminium and the wing is covered in doped aircraft fabric covering. The wing has large ailerons, a 22:1 aspect ratio and a  span. The tailplane and elevator are small in size. The normal flight centre of gravity is at 35% of chord, which is more aft than usual with the NACA 43012A airfoil employed.

Only one GW-6 was constructed and it was registered with the Federal Aviation Administration as an Experimental - Amateur-built.

Operational history
Soaring Magazine reported that the GW-6 had about 65 hours of flying time by late in the summer of 1983, Whigham having flown it that season while building the GW-7. In July 2011 the aircraft was still on the FAA registry and owned by John B. Waters of San Diego, California.

Specifications (GW-6)

See also

References

1980s United States sailplanes
Homebuilt aircraft
Aircraft first flown in 1983
Mid-wing aircraft